Kunduana House, situated in the Dinga village of Chakdina, is reputed to be one of the finest country houses in Pakistan, and has been designated by Pakistan Heritage as a grade I listed building.

Description
It was visited by many well known political figures such as Benazir Bhutto, Pervez Musharraf, Nawaz Sharif and Chaudhry Shujaat Hussain. The house is still under construction and is expected to be completed in 2008. The 'Kunduana House' gatehouse has become the front entrance of the house, and the impressive former front elevation is now overlooking a grass lawn surrounded by flower borders, rather than the original entrance courtyard.

The ongoing costs of construction of Kunduana is thought to have exceeded the region of 417,000,000 Rupees (allowing for inflation, approximately £3.5m in 2006). The house is used as the private residence of Choudary Abdul Saeed and family. On July 14, 2007, the nephews of Choudhary Abdul Saeed, Choudhary Rizwan Mushaid Anwar, and Choudhary Sirbuland Khan officially declared the servant house and gatehouses open.

References

2008 establishments in Pakistan
Houses in Pakistan